The Zújar is a 214 km long river in Spain. It the largest left hand tributary to the Guadiana.

Course
Its source is at La Calaveruela hill in the Sierra Morena near Fuente Obejuna. It flows across Northwestern Córdoba Province and then through the Campiña Sur and La Serena comarcas of Extremadura. Finally it flows into the Guadiana at the Embalse de La Serena reservoir in Villanueva de la Serena.

Its main tributaries are Guadamatilla, Guadalmez, Esteras and Guadalemar, from its right margin; and the Guadalefra on its left margin.

See also 
 List of rivers of Spain

References

External links 
 Confederación hidrográfica del Guadiana

Rivers of Spain
Rivers of Andalusia
Rivers of Extremadura
Guadiana